Neypahan (also known as Neybahān) is a village in Sumar Rural District, Sumar District, Qasr-e Shirin County, Kermanshah Province, Iran. At the 2006 census, its population was 17, in 4 families.

References 

Populated places in Qasr-e Shirin County